Kyambura Hydroelectric Power Station, commonly referred to as Kyambura Power Station, is a  mini hydroelectric power station in Uganda.

Location
The geographical coordinates of the power station are: 00°12'39.0"S, 30°07'04.0"E (Latitude:-0.210833; Longitude:30.117778).

Overview
The original design had the main intake via a "headrace tunnel". In the new design, that has been replaced by a "headrace canal". This has reduced project costs and construction time. The budgeted cost of construction is US$24 million.

Construction timeline
Construction began in early 2017 and commissioning was effected in the second half of 2019. Three Sri Lankan civil contractors; KSJ Construction, SSP Engineers and Sanken Overseas Limited were actively engaged on the project. Construction was completed and synchronization tests to the national grid concluded in July 2019. Commercial output commenced in August 2019.

GET-Fit Uganda Program
This power station benefited from the GET-Fit Uganda Program, administered by KfW. Kyambura Hydroelectric Power Station received US$2.4 million in GET-Fit funding, out of the US$24 million construction costs.

See also

 Africa Dams
 Uganda Power Stations

References

External links
Website of the Electricity Regulatory Authority

Hydroelectric power stations in Uganda
Rubirizi District
Western Region, Uganda
Dams completed in 2019
2019 establishments in Uganda
Buildings and structures in Uganda